Rear Admiral Benjamin Ohene-Kwapong was a Ghanaian naval personnel and served in the Ghana Navy. He served as Chief of Naval Staff of the Ghana Navy from July 1985 to June 1990.

References

Ghanaian military personnel
Ghana Navy personnel
Chiefs of Naval Staff (Ghana)